María Arrillaga is a Puerto Rican poet who has been a professor at the University of Puerto Rico. She taught in the Spanish Department on the Rio Piedras campus. She is a member of PEN American Center as well as PEN Club de Puerto Rico. She was a member of the Women's Writing Committee of PEN International, served as its secretary and organizer for Latin America. Arrillaga was president of PEN Club de Puerto Rico during 1989–1991.

She is the author of several collections of poetry. According to Matos Paoli, the poetry of Maria Arrillaga participates in the "demythologizing conventional culture" both in the claiming of human sexual nature and in its commitment to social justice.

She has contributed to the following journals: Confrontation, Cupey, Festa Da Palabra, PEN International, and Tercer Milenio.

Arrillaga was a 1996 fiction finalist at the Institute of Latin American Writers. In Puerto Rico, she has won awards for poetry, essays, and fiction.

She is currently working on a book of memoirs, The Guava Orchard, and has a home in two cities; New York and Old San Juan, Puerto Rico.

Academic credentials
1961 – B.S. St. Louis University, St. Louis, Missouri, Major: English; Minors: Spanish, Theology, Philosophy.
1966 – M.A., School of Education New York University, New York, Major: Spanish.
1976 – University of Dijon, France. Advanced course work, six credits.
1987 – PhD, magna cum laude, University of Puerto Rico. Majors: Latin American and Puerto Rican literature, Women's Studies.

Professional experience
1962–63 Typist, translator, and interpreter at St. Luke's Hospital.
1965–66 Spanish teacher, Yeshiva Rabbi Samson Raphael Hirsch, 91 Bennet Avenue, New York City.
1966–67 Spanish teacher, O. Henry School, 17th Street, New York City (Public school system).
1967–68 Recreational Director, I Spy Health Program, Beth Israel Hospital, 90 Nathan D. Paerlman Place, New York City.
1968–69 Spanish Instructor, SEEK Program of the City University of New York, University Center, 154 West 71st Street, New York City.
1969–70 Substitute teacher at Onteora High School, Woodstock, New York and at Astor Home for Challenged Children, Rhinebeck, New York.
1970–71 Instructor of Art and Music of Puerto Rico, New York City Technical College, Brooklyn, New York.
1971–73 Writer. Department of Education Press, Hato Rey, Puerto Rico.
1973–2001 Spanish Professor, College of General Studies, University of Puerto Rico, Río Piedras Campus.
1993–94 Visiting professor, York College, Queens (CUNY), Courses in Women's Literature and Creative Writing.
2002–2005 Adjunct professor of Spanish, New York City Technical College, Brooklyn, New York.

Awards and honors
Fiction finalist, 1996 Latino Literature Prize, Instituto de Escritores Latinoamericanos\Latin American Writer's Institute, Isaac Goldenberg, director, Eugenio María de Hostos College, New York.
Mañana Valentina, novel, finalist in Letras de Oro Contest sponsored by University of Miami, 1994.
First prize, short story, "En reticencia" ("In reticence") Institute of Business Administration, P.R. Jr. College, Mayagüez, P.R., December 1992.
Medal of Honor, Josefina Romo Arregui Memorial Foundation for contribution to literature, New York, 1990.
Luis Lloréns Torres prize awarded by the Puerto Rican Academy of the Spanish Language for best Ph. D. Dissertation of the year in the Department of Hispanic Studies of the University of Puerto Rico, May 1987. Title of dissertation: "An Introduction to Feminist Literary Criticism: Three Puerto Rican Authors: Edelmira González Maldonado, Anagilda Garrastegui, Violeta López Suria".
First prize, short story, Institute of Business Administration, Puerto Rico Jr. College, Mayagüez, P.R., December 1984.
First Prize, Institute of Business Administration, P.R. Junior College, Mayagüez, 1982. 
First Prize, Institute of Puerto Rican Literature, 1981, for Frescura 1981 (Freshness 1981) Río Piedras, Mairena, 1981, 112 pp.
Honorable Mention Institute of Puerto Rican Literature 1977, for Poemas 747, Madrid, Seteco, 1977, 50 pp.
First prize, Puerto Rican Athenaeum 1972, for Vida en el tiempo, San Juan, Institute of Puerto Rican Culture, 1974, 134 pp.
Included in several bibliographical dictionaries:
Diccionario de personalidades puertorriqueñas de hoy, Archivo Biográfico Puertorriqueño, 1978–79
Invited to be visiting professor at the University of Morón, Argentina, 1993.

Literary publications

Poetry

Poetry collectionsFlamingos en San Juan/Flamingos in Manhattan, San Juan, Puerto Rico, Ediciones Puerto, 2012, 207 pp.Cuidades como mares: Poesia 1966–1993, San Juan, Puerto Rico, Isla negra, 2012, 292 pp.Yo soy Filí Melé ("I am Fili Mele"), compilation of previous work and two additional unpublished collections. Río Piedras, Puerto Rico, University of PR Press, 1999, 276 pp.Frescura 1981 ("Freshness 1981"), Río Piedras, Puerto Rico, Mairena, 1981, 112 pp.Poemas 747, Poems 747, Madrid, Seteco, 1977, 50 pp.Cascada de sol ("Cascade of sun"), San Juan, Puerto Rico, Institute of Puerto Rican Culture, 1977, 92 pp.New York in the Sixties, Youlgrave, Bakewell, Derbyshire, England, Hub Publications Ltd, 1976, 20 pp.Vida en el tiempo ("Life in time"), San Juan, Institute of Puerto Rican Culture, 1974, 134 pp.

Poetry in literary reviews, newspapers, and internet
"Christine/Cristina/Christa", Identidad, literary review, editor, Leticia Ruiz, Colegio Regional de Aguadilla, PR, 2009.
"Crisantemos/Chrysantemums", Sequoyah No. 21, internet literary review, Gabriela López, Carlos Dzur, editors, 2009
"Elegía para Anya/Elegy For Anya", Sequoyah No. 22, internet literary review, Gabriela L[opez, Carlos Dzur, editors, 2009.
"Scars", internet literary review, Woodstock Poetry Society, www.woodstockpoetry.com, Phillip Levine, editor, 2007The Blue Angel, WestView, The New Voice of the West Village (June 2009)
"Propúxenme a vivir", O Correo Galego, Galicia, Spain, May 21, 1995, p. 56. Translated by Ursula Heinze.
"Set on living", PEN International, XLII, 2, 1992, pp. 74–75.
"Entonces" ("Then"), Mairena, 1989, XI, 28, p. 84.
"Little feet cold", Sargasso, English Department, College of Humanities, University of Puerto Rico, Río Piedras, 1988, 5, p. 32.
"A las poetas de mi generación" ("To the Poets of my Generation"), El reportero, San Juan, Fall 1983.
"Escuchando la Novena sinfonía de Beethoven" ("Listening to Beethoven's Ninth Symphony"), Mairena, Río Piedras, Fall 1982, IV, 10, p. 86.
"Meláncolica camino" ("Melancholy I Walk"), Mairena, Río Piedras, Spring 1982, IV, 9, p. 79.
"Meteóricamente" ("Meteor Like"), Ausubo, review of The Colegio Regional de la Montaña, Utuado, P.R., March 1982, I, 2, p. 41.
"El hombre es una rosa" ("The Man Is a Rose"), "Trazo una línea negra sobre mi párpado", "Accenting my eye line with Kohl", Renacimiento, Río Piedras, P.R., July–December 1981, I, 2, pp. 91–92.
"Hoy me vestí para mí" ("Today I Dressed for Myself"), El Mundo, San Juan, December 13, 1981.
"Se esclarece mi casa" ("My House Lights Up"), El Mundo, San Juan, November 8, 1981, p. 13 C.
"Este es el mundo del terror" ("This is the World of Terror"), "Claridad", "En Rojo", San Juan, January 30 – February 5, 1981, p. 9.
"Al tío Fan" ("To my Uncle Fan"), "El vocero", San Juan, November 29, 1980, p. 16.
"Poemas de María Arrillaga" ("Poems by María Arrillaga"), "Claridad", "En rojo", San Juan, November 28 December 4, 1980, p. 12.
"Hágase la luz" ("Let There Be Light"), "Ultimo tango" ("Last Tango"), "Muñecos en mi mente" ("Rag Dolls in my Head"), Mairena, Río Piedras, Fall 1979, I, 2, p. 31.
"Todi", "Villa Gregoriana", Revista/Review Interamericana, Interamerican University of Puerto Rico, Hato Rey, Puerto Rico, 1978, VIII, 1, p. 31.
"Poemas de María Arrillaga" ("Poems by María Arrillaga"), "Claridad", "En rojo", San Juan, June 24, 30 1977, p. 19.
"Meteóricamente" ("Meteor Like"), Guajana, San Juan, January March 1977, 5, p. 1.
"Sleep", IPSE, International Poetry Society, Youlgrave, Bakewell, Derbyshire, England, Hub Publications, July 1976, 3, p. 40.
"Cuento de hadas" ("Fairy Tale"), "El Mundo", San Juan, January 11, 1976, p. 6 B.
"Dreams", NOW, Jamaica, Spring 1974, 4/5, p. 22.
"De ocho a cuatro y media de la tarde" ("From Eight to Four O'clock in the Afternoon"), "En un plato de arroz con habichuelas" ("In a Plate of Rice and Beans"), Comunidad, Iberoamerican University, México, December 1973, VIII, 46, pp. 679–681.
"Canción" ("Song"), Atenea, College of Arts and Sciences, University of Puerto Rico, Mayagüez, September 1973, X, 3, p. 134.
"Dos poemas" ("Two Poems"), Sin nombre, San Juan, July–September 1973, IV, 1, pp. 42–43.
"To a Folk Singer", NOW, Jamaica, Fall 1973, 3, pp. 15–17.
"La lámpara mágica" ("The Magic Lamp"), Revista del Instituto de Cultura Puertorriqueña, San Juan, January–March 1973, XVI, 58, pp. 37–38.
"Viernes santo" ("Good Friday"), "Cuento de hadas" ("Fairy Tale"), Comunidad, México, Diciembre 1972, VII, 40, pp. 695–698
"Kiss the Goldfish", NOW, Jamaica, 1972, 1, pp. 22–24.

Fiction

Novel
Mañana Valentina ("Tomorrow Valentina") Institute of Puerto Rican Culture and Room of One's Own Publisher, Chile, 1995.

Short stories (In literary reviews and newspapers)
"Enero" ("January"), Festa da palabra silenciada, Galicia, España, Winter 1991, pp. 155–157.
"January", Gloria Waldman, translator, Mother Tongues, Ganges, B.C. Canada, Winter 1991, 2, pp. 63–66.
"Mosquito", "Claridad", "En rojo", San Juan, April 21, 27, 1989, p. 24.
"Del gato" ("Cat"), Anales, Society of Puerto Rican Authors, VII, 7, 1987 88, pp. 109–110.
"En voces de mujer" ("Women's Voices"), Islote, Hormigueros, P.R., December 1987, II, 1, pp. 115–118.
"De los vestidos" (|"From Many Dresses"), Caribán, Río Piedras, Cultural, January August 1987, II, 1 2, pp. 10–11.
"De la nostalgia" ("About Nostalgia"), Cupey, Colegio Universitario Metropolitano, Río Piedras, July–December 1986, III, 2, pp. 141–143.
"Con Adele H." ("With Adele H"), Islote, Hormigueros, P.R., December 1985, I, 1, pp. 39–41.
"De rojo" ("In Red"), Talleres, P.R. Jr. College, Río Piedras, 1985, III, 3 4, pp. 133–135.
"De los violines" ("Violins"), Cupey, Colegio Universitario Metropolitano, Río Piedras, July–December 1984, I, 2, pp. 167–173.
"De los espejos" ("Mirrors"), Mariel, New York, Fall 1984, II, 7, pp. 9–10.
"Del gato" ("Cats"), Talleres, Puerto Rico Jr. College, Río Piedras, II, 2, January–June 1984, pp. 85–86.
"En reticencia": una estética para el futuro" (fragmento) ("In Reticence": an Aesthetic for the Future (fragment)), Anales, Sociedad de autores puertorriqueños, Society of Puerto Rican Authors, San Juan, 1983–84, pp. 75–76.
"Una cuestión de tamaño" ("Size"),"Claridad", "En rojo", San Juan, November 21–27, 1980, p. 9.
"Lost Baby", NOW, Jamaica, Spring 1974, 1, pp. 22–24.

Essay

Prologues

"El tango del amor homoerótico en Debellaqueras de Daniel Torres"/"Tango of Homoerotic Love in Debellaqueras of Daniel Torres", Debellaqueras, poetry collection by Daniel Torres, Isla Negra Editores, San Juan, Santo Domingo, 2009.
"Prologue" to Cuadernos de taller/Literary Workshop Sample, Taller de redacción de memorias/Memoir Writing Workshop, San Juan, PR, Institute of Puerto Rican Culture, 2002.
"El pan nuestro de cada día"/"Our Daily Bread", prologue to a collection of short stories by Evelyn Cruz, Cidra, Puerto Rico, 2001.
"Taller de poesía-1981", Prologue to the publication of a poetry workshop, Faculty of General Studies, University of Puerto Rico, 1981.

In guidebooks, newspapers, and reviews
"The Conservatory Garden", p. 338; The Booklyn Botanica Garden, p. 435; City Secrets, New York City, The Little Book Room, editor, Robert Kahn, 2002.
"La llegada" ("The Arrival"), "Claridad", "En rojo", San Juan, 5 11 May 1989, p. 23.
"El manjar necesario de la poesía" ("Poetry as Necessary Precious Nourishment"), "Diálogo", Río Piedras, April 1989, p. 24.
"U.P.R.", "El Nuevo Día", San Juan, January 21, 1989, p. 55.
"Ante el monumento a Eugenio María de Hostos" ("In Front of the Monument to Eugenio María de Hostos"), El antillano, Boletín del círculo martiano, San Juan, 1986, II, 1, p. 5.
"No ha muerto el tío Fan" ("Uncle Fan Has not Died"), "El reportero", San Juan, May 21, 1985, p. 17.
"Areyto", Educación, Departamento de Instrucción Pública, Hato Rey, P.R., June 1973, 37, pp. 202–204.

Children's literature
Articles, poems, short stories (English and Spanish), translations (English to Spanish), Revista Escuela, Departamento de Instrucción Pública, Hato Rey, Puerto Rico, February–March 1972, December–January 1973–74.

Poetry
"My Angel and Me", April–May 1973, XXIII, 5, p. 27.
"Thanksgiving is Giving Thanks", October–November 1972, XXIII, 2, p. 27.
"I want To Be the Color of the Sun", April–May 1972, XXII, 5, p. 24.
"Quiero ser color de sol", April–May 1972, XXII, 5, p. 25.
"Saint Elena", February–March 1972, XXII, 4, p. 23.

Stories
"If I Close My Eyes it Snows", December–January 1973–74, XXIV, 2,k p. 24–25.
"Froggy the Frog", February–March 1973, XXIII, 4, p. 24–25.
"Tale Without End", August–September 1973, XXIV, 1, p. 30–31.
"A Present for the Kings", December–January 1972–73, XXIII, 3, p. 24–26.
"Grandfather Story", October–November 1972, XXIII, 2, p. 24–25.

TheaterSchool of Fish, February–March 1973 XXIII, 4, p. 24–25.A Group of Friends, August–September 1972, XXIII, 1, p. 24–26.

Articles
"What is Christmas", December–January 1972–73, XXIII, 3, p. 23.
"A Very Special Puerto Rican Christmas Greeting", December–January 1972–73, XXIII, 3, p. 29–31.
"El reino de la tierra" ("The Kingdom of the Earth") October–November 1972, XXIII, 2, p. 12–15.
"Puerto Rican Fall", August–September 1972, XXIII, 1, p. 27–29.
"Summer is Fun", April–May 1972, XXII, 5, p. 23.
"Florencio Cabán", February–March 1972, XXII, 4, p. 18–21.

Interviews
"Científicos en ciernes" ("Beginning Scientists") August–September 1973, XXIV, 1, p. 7–12.
"Helen Roche: Una joven que ha llegado lejos" ("Helen Roche": An Accomplished Young Woman"), October–November 1972, XXIII, 2, p. 19–21.
"De entrevista con Luz Hilda Molina" ("Interview with Luz Hilda Molina"), August–September 1972, XXIII, 1, p. 14–15.

Translations: English to Spanish
"Operación traiganlos vivos" ("Operation Bring Them Alive"), February–March 1973, XXIII, 4, p. 20–21.
"Nombres de países pueden convertirse en pesadilla de cartógrafos" ("Names of Countries Can Become Cartographer's Nightmares"), December–January 1972–73, p. 14–15.
"Fabricantes de lluvia pueden exagerar su tarea" ("Rain Makers Can Overdo Themselves"), February–March 1972, XXII, 4, p. 17–18.

Translations: Spanish to English
Rapunzel, December–January 1973–74, XXIV, 3, p. 28–29.
"My Ship", February–March 1973, XXIII, 4, p. 29.

Literary biography
"Encuentros con Manuel" ("Encounters with Manuel"), "Claridad", En Rojo, San Juan, November 9–15, 1990, p. 30.
"Hasta siempre, Manuel" ("Till always, Manuel"), El Mundo, "Puerto Rico Ilustrado", San Juan, October 14, 1990.
"La mujer como escritora: escritura de mujer" ("Woman as Writer: Writing by Woman"), La revista del Centro de Estudios Avanzados de Puerto Rico y el Caribe, San Juan, January–June 1987, 4, pp. 102–107.
"La mujer como escritora: escritura de mujer", Talleres, P.R. Jr. College, Río Piedras, 4, 2, 1987, pp. 107–117.
"Historia de una censura III" ("A Case of Censorship III"), in Imágenes e identidades: el puertorriqueño en la literatura de Asela Rodríguez de Laguna, Río Piedras, Huracán, 1985, pp. 161–168.
"A Manuel de María" ("To Manuel From María"), "Claridad", En Rojo, January 30 – February 5, 1981, p. 9.
"El poeta: trabajador del pensamiento" ("The Poet as Intellectual Worker"), "El Mundo", San Juan, January 4, 1981, p. 10 A.
"Entrevista con María Arrillaga" ("Interview: María Arrillaga"), Mairena, Río Piedras, Fall 1979, I, 2, pp. 31–36.
"Carta abierta al crítico literario" ("Open Letter to the Literary Critic"), "El Mundo", San Juan, November 1978, p. 10 B.
"These Streets That Are Not Mean, a memoir", Confrontation: A Literary Journal of Long Island University, No. 56/57, Summer/Fall 1995, p. 47–55.
"El mundo de mi infancia: homenaje a Nilita" ("When I Was a Child: Tribute to Nilita"), La Torre (NE), San Juan, July–December 1993, VII, 27–28, p. 695–705.

Work included in anthologies
“Asesinato en las galerías de Vicente Van Gogh: los dibujos" ("Murder in the Vincent Van Gogh Galleries: The Drawings”), Noches de Cornelia: A Bilingual Anthology of Contemporary Poets, Ediciones Godot, Buenos Aires, Argentina, Madeline Millán, ed., 2008.
“Cicatrices” (“Scars”), in: La mujer rota, edited by Patricia Medina, Literalia Editors, Guadalajara, México, 2008, p. 73.
“Yo soy Filí Melé” in: Literatura puertorriqueña del Siglo XX, Antología, edited by Mercedes López Baralt University of Puerto Rico Press, Río Piedras, 2004, p. 960.
"Propúxenme vivir" ("I Have Decided to Live"), Galician translation of the original Spanish, in anthology: Versos de Terras Distantes, edited by Ursula Heinze de Lorenzo, O Correo Galego, Spain, Santiago de Compostela, 1995, p. 140–141.
Several poems included in: These Are Not Sweet Girls: Poetry by Latin American Women, edited by Marjorie Agosin, Fredonia, N. Y., White Pine Press, 1994.
"Como Raquel" ("Like Raquel"), "Rosa/Filí", "Filí/Beatriz", poems, Yo soy ... I am: A Celebration of Women Latina Poets, Iris Chen, editor, New York, Nuyorican Poets Café, December 15, 1993.
Poems included in: New Voices (IX Poets), Madrid, Torremozas, p. 7–12, 1992.
"Me he propuesto vivir", "Frescura", "Filí/María", Festa de la Poesía, Palau de la Música Catalana, Barcelona, P.E.N. Congress, April 1992, p. 25–30.
Sueño, Dream, Rêve; Joven, Youth, Jeune; Paraula de dona, Barcelona, P.E.N. Congress, April 1992, p. 5–12.
"Felícita/Filí", Cuadernos de poesía nueva, New Poetry Collection, Asociación Prometeo de Poesía, Madrid, March 1992, p. 47.
Several poems included in: Pedro López Adorno, Papiros de Babel (Papyrus from Babel), San Juan, University of Puerto Rico Press, 1991.
"En una sola torre" ("In One Single Tower)", San Juan, Guajana, XXV, 1987 pp. 77–95.
"La lámpara mágica" ("The Magic Lamp"), in: Theressa Ortiz de Hadjopoulos, Antología de la mujer puertorriqueña/Anthology of Puerto Rican Women Writers, New York, Península Publishing, 1981, pp. 13–15.
"Pigeon Wing Fly", in: Nick Toczek, Melanthika, an anthology of Pan Caribbean Writing, Birmingham, England, Little Word Machine, 1977, p. 12.
"I Want for my Name", translation of the poem "Quiero para mi nombre" by Angela María Dávila, in: Alone Amidst All This Noise, a collection of women's poetry, New York, Four Winds Press, 1976, p. 103.
"Cinco poemas" ("Five Poems"), in: Lydia Zoraida Barreto, Poemario de la mujer puertorriqueña (Poetry by Puerto Rican Women), San Juan, Instituto de Cultura Puertorriqueña, Literatura hoy, I, I, 10, October 1976, pp. 47–51.
"Like a Chambered Nautilus", in: William LLoyd Griffin, Quality American Poetry 1975–76, III, Huntington, West Virginia, Valley Publications, 1976, p. 12.
English translations of poetry by Evaristo Ribera Chevremont, Julia de Burgos, José María Lima, Marina Arzola, Angela María Dávila, in: Alfredo Matilla and Iván Silén, The Puerto Rican Poets, New York, Bantam, 1972.

Forthcoming publicationsThe Guava Orchard, A Puerto Rican MemoirFlamingos en San Juan/Flamingoes in Manhattan, bilingual poetry collection.

Academic publications and other work

Literary criticism
"Nota sobre la novela puertorriqueña de hoy: Pedro Juan Soto, Luis Rafael Sánchez, Carmelo Rodríguez Torres, Edgardo Rodríguez Juliá" ("About Contemporary Puerto Rican Novelists: Pedro Juan Soto, Luis Rafael Sánchez, Carmelo Rodríguez Torres, Edgardo Rodríguez Juliá"), Revista de Estudios Generales, Universidad de Puerto Rico, Río Piedras, January–June 1987, I, 1, pp. 65–71.
"Una rosa deslumbrantemente verde: poética de Evaristo Ribera Chevremont" ("A Dazzling Green Rose: The Poetry of Evaristo Ribera Cheveremont"), Revista del Instituto de Cultura Puertorriqueña, San Juan, January February March, XXV, 91, 1986, pp. 22–33.
"Presencia de don Federico de Onís en la literatura puertorriqueña: La poesía post modernista en Puerto Rico" ("Federico de Onís and Post Modernist Literature in Puerto Rico"), Revista de Estudios Hipánicos, Universidad de Puerto Rico, Río Piedras, 1985, XII, pp. 215–218.
"Los heraldos negros de César Vallejo: Apreciación de conjunto y análisis formal de algunos poemas" ("The Black Heralds by César Vallejo"), Revista del Instituto de Cultura Puertorriqueña, San Juan, October–December 1984, pp. 37–41.
"Enajenación social y lingüística en La guaracha del Macho Camacho" ("Linguistic and social alienation in Macho Camacho's Beat"), Homines, Universidad Interamericana de Puerto Rico, Hato Rey, P.R., February–December 1983, 7, 1 2, pp. 39–52.
"Enajenación social y lingüistica en La guaracha del Macho Camacho de Luis Rafael Sánchez", (abbreviated version), Hispamérica, Gaithersburg, Maryland, April–August 1983, XII, 34–35, pp. 155–164.
"La ideología en un texto de primaria puertorriqueño" ("Ideology in an Elementary School Text"), Hispania, AATSP, May 1982, 65, 2, pp. 266–268.
"'Menos es más' o la obsesión de Gerald Guinness" ("'Less is More', Gerald Guinness's Obsession"), "Claridad", "En rojo", San Juan, 12 19 March 1982, pp. 10–11.
"Problemas de la historiografía literaria puertorriqueña y latinoamericana" ("Problems of Puerto Rican and Latin American Literary History"), "Claridad", En rojo, San Juan, January 1–7, 1982, p. 8.

Book reviews
"Divided Arrival: Narratives of the Puerto Rican Migration 1920 1950", Revista de Historia, San Juan, January December 1988, 7, pp. 195-97.
"Isla y mar de Vieques, voz épica de Angel Rigau" ("Island and Sea of Vieques, Epic Voice of Angel Rigau"), El Mundo, San Juan, March 25, 1984, p. 15C.
"Carmelo Rodríguez Torres, La casa y la llama fiera" ("The House and the Fiery Flame by Carmelo Rodríguez Torres"), El reportero, San Juan, July 14, 1982, p. 20.

Women's studies and feminist literary criticism

BooksConcierto de voces insurgentes, Concert of Insurgent Voices: Three Puerto Rican Authors, Edelmira González Maldonado, Violeta López Suria, Anagilda Garrastegui, Isla Negra Editors and  Office of the Dean of Graduate Studies, University of Puerto Rico, Río Piedras, 1995.Escritura de mujer: Un modelo crítico feminista y su applicación a tres autoras puertorriqueñas (Women's Writing: A Feminist Literary Criticism Model: Three Puerto Rican Authors), 842 pp., Ann Arbor, Michigan (UMI) University Microfilms International, 1993, order # 9328669.Los silencios de María Bibiana Benítez, María Bibiana Benítez' Silences, San Juan, Institute of Puerto Rican Culture, 1985, 70 pp.

Work included in anthologies and bibliographies
"Trabajo literario de la mujer en la literatura puertorriqueña de la segunda mitad del Siglo XX" ("Women's Writing in Puerto Rican Literature During the Second Half of the Twentieth Century"), 22 Conferences of Puerto Rican Literature, San Juan, Ateneo Puertorriqueño, LEA, 1994, pp. 100–116.
"La ruta de Julia de Burgos" ("Julia de Burgos' Voyage"), Actas del Congreso Internacional Julia de Burgos, Annals of the Julia de Burgos Congress, Edgar Martínez Masdeu, editor, San Juan, Ateneo Puertorriqueño, 1993, pp. 408–415.
"Un currículo balanceado: para no defraudar el ejercicio de la docencia", en: Hacia un currículo no sexista: Integración de los Estudios de la Mujer y el Género en los cursos introductorios de español, inglés y ciencias sociales en la Universidad de Puerto Rico, ed. Yamila Azize ("A Balanced Curriculum: In Order not to Defraud our Mission as Educators", Towards a Non Sexist Curriculum: Integration of Women and Gender Studies in the Introductory Courses of Spanish, English and Social Sciences at the University of Puerto Rico, ed. Yamila Azize"), Proyecto de Estudios de la Mujer, Colegio Universitario de Cayey, Universidad de Puerto Rico, Cayey, P.R., March 1992.
"Escritura de mujer en la literatura puertorriqueña y universal" ("Women's Writing in Puerto Rican and Universal Literature"), Perspectives & Resources: Integrating Latin American and Caribbean Women into the Curriculum and Research, compiled and edited by Edna Acosta-Belén and Christine E. Bose, Center for Latin America and the Caribbean and Institute for Research on Women, State University of New York, Albany, New York, 1991, pp. 262–278.
Yamila Azize Vargas y Knana Soldevila Picó, "Mujer y libro en Puerto Rico", Women and Books in Puerto Rico, Proyecto de Estudios de la Mujer, Women's Studies Project, Colegio Universitario de Cayey, Universidad de Puerto Rico, Cayey, P.R., 1990, pp. 8, 33.

Work published in reviews and newspapers
"Mujer, literatura y sociedad" ("Women, Literature and Society"), Cupey, review of Metropolitan University, Río Piedras, January–December 1992, X, 1 and 2, pp. 162–178.
"Casi yo: Marina Arzola" ("Marina Arzola: Almost I"), Cupey, review of the Metropolitan University, Río Piedras, VIII, 1991, pp. 152–157.
"Puerto Rican Literature Today: Transforming Desire", PEN International, London, England, 1991, XLI, 1, pp. 91–94.
"Homenaje a Violeta López Suria" ("Homage to Violeta López Suria"), Exégesis, Colegio Universitario de Humacao, Humacao, P.R., October–December 1989, 3, 8, pp. 57–61.
"Atisbos feministas en La ruta de su evasión de Yolanda Oreamuno" ("Feminist Signs in The Road of Her Evasion by Yolanda Oreamuno"), Caribbean Studies, Centro de Estudios del Caribe, Center of Caribbean Studies, University of Puerto Rico, Río Piedras, July–December 1989, 22, 3 4, pp. 47–56.
"La literatura puertorriqueña de hoy: deseo transformador" ("Transforming Desire: Puerto Rican Literature Today"), "Claridad", "En rojo", San Juan, September 1–7, 1989, XXXI, 1909, pp. 16–17.
"Escritura de mujer en Edelmira González Maldonado y Anagilda Garrastegui" ("Women's Writing in Edelmira González Maldonado and Anagilda Garrastegui"), Revista de Estudios Generales, Universidad de Puerto Rico, Río Piedras, July 1988 June 1989, 3, 3, pp. 284–292.
"Documentos de la otra de Soledad Cruz" ("Documents of the Other by Soledad Cruz"), in: Soledad Cruz, Documentos de la otra, San Juan, Comité puertorriqueño de intelectuales, Puerto Rican Committee of Intellectuals, 1988, pp. 147–153.
"La mujer en La sataniada de Alejandro Tapia y Rivera" ("Women in The sataniada by Alejandro Tapia y Rivera"), Revista de Estudios Generales, Universidad de Puerto Rico, Río Piedras, July 1987 – June 1988, II, 2, pp. 79–94.
"La narrativa de la mujer puertorriqueña en la década del setenta" ("Narrative of Puerto Rican Women Writers in the Seventies"), Homines, Universidad Interamericana de Puerto Rico, Hato Rey, P.R., August 1986 – February 1987, 10, 2, pp. 339–346, third edition; 2nd edition: January–June 1984, 8, 1, pp. 327–334; 1st edition: January–June 1982, 6, 1, pp. 43–50.
"El cuento puertorriqueño actual" ("The Contemporary Puerto Rican Short Story"), La revista del Centro de Estudios Avanzados de Puerto Rico y del Caribe, San Juan, July–December 1986, 3, pp. 27–30.
"Presencia de la mujer en la literatura puertorriqueña contemporánea" ("Women's Writing in Contemporary Puerto Rican Literature"), El sol, revista de la Asociación de maestros de Puerto Rico, Hato Rey, P.R., January May 1982, XXV, 4, pp. 12–13.
"Luis Palés Matos: poeta de resistencia antillana" ("Luis Palés Matos: Poetry of Antillean Resistance"), "Claridad", "En rojo", San Juan, P.R.  March 10, 26 pp. 1–5, Honorable Mention, Claridad, 1980.
"Hoy me vestí para mí" ("Today I Dressed for Myself"), El Mundo, San Juan, December 13, 1981.
"Se esclarece mi casa" ("My House Lights Up"), El Mundo, San Juan, November 8, 1981, p.s. de María Bibiana Benítez, María Bibiana Benítez' Silences, San Juan, Institute of Puerto Rican Culture, 1985, 70 pp.

See also

 List of Puerto Rican writers
 Puerto Rican literature
 Multi-Ethnic Literature of the United States

References

1940 births
Living people
20th-century American novelists
20th-century American poets
21st-century American poets
American feminist writers
American women short story writers
American women novelists
American women poets
People from Mayagüez, Puerto Rico
Puerto Rican feminists
Puerto Rican poets
Spanish feminist writers
Spanish feminists
Spanish poets
Spanish women writers
University of Puerto Rico faculty
University of Puerto Rico, Río Piedras Campus
20th-century American women writers
21st-century American women writers
20th-century American short story writers
21st-century American short story writers
American women academics